Amesti is a census-designated place (CDP) in Santa Cruz County, California, United States. The population was 2,637 as of the 2020 United States census.

Amesti is named for José Amesti, a Basque who came to California in 1822, and who was the grantee of Rancho Los Corralitos.

Geography
Amesti is located at  (36.959210, -121.782131).

Demographics

2010
At the 2010 census Amesti had a population of 3,478. The racial makeup of Amesti was 1,889 (54.3%) White, 12 (0.3%) African American, 41 (1.2%) Native American, 89 (2.6%) Asian, 1,309 (37.6%) from other races, and 137 (3.9%) from two or more races. Hispanic or Latino of any race were 2,273 persons (65.4%).

The census reported that 99.6% of the population lived in households and 0.4% lived in non-institutionalized group quarters.

There were 982 households, 509 (51.8%) had children under the age of 18 living in them, 576 (58.7%) were opposite-sex married couples living together, 158 (16.1%) had a female householder with no husband present, 56 (5.7%) had a male householder with no wife present.  There were 68 (6.9%) unmarried opposite-sex partnerships, and 12 (1.2%) same-sex married couples or partnerships. 143 households (14.6%) were one person and 71 (7.2%) had someone living alone who was 65 or older. The average household size was 3.53.  There were 790 families (80.4% of households); the average family size was 3.83.

The age distribution was 1,100 people (31.6%) under the age of 18, 343 people (9.9%) aged 18 to 24, 895 people (25.7%) aged 25 to 44, 805 people (23.1%) aged 45 to 64, and 335 people (9.6%) who were 65 or older.  The median age was 31.3 years. For every 100 females, there were 95.3 males.  For every 100 females age 18 and over, there were 89.3 males.

The homeowner vacancy rate was 0.3%; the rental vacancy rate was 1.3%. 56.6% of the population lived in owner-occupied housing units and 42.9% lived in rental housing units.

2000
At the 2000 census there were 2,436 people, 760 households, and 589 families in the CDP. The racial makeup of the CDP in 2010 was 30.6% non-Hispanic White, 0.3% non-Hispanic African American, 0.5% Native American, 2.2% Asian, and 1.1% from two or more races. Hispanic or Latino of any race were 65.4%.

Of the 760 households 38.6% had children under the age of 18 living with them, 61.2% were married couples living together, 11.1% had a female householder with no husband present, and 22.5% were non-families. 17.5% of households were one person and 8.8% were one person aged 65 or older.  The average household size was 3.21 and the average family size was 3.56.

The age distribution was 30.2% under the age of 18, 7.4% from 18 to 24, 26.8% from 25 to 44, 21.6% from 45 to 64, and 14.0% 65 or older.  The median age was 36 years. For every 100 females, there were 97.6 males.  For every 100 females age 18 and over, there were 92.5 males.

The median household income was $45,558 and the median family income  was $48,036. Males had a median income of $43,800 versus $30,223 for females. The per capita income for the CDP was $18,422.  About 14.0% of families and 14.4% of the population were below the poverty line, including 18.9% of those under age 18 and none of those age 65 or over.

Government

References

External links

Census-designated places in Santa Cruz County, California
Census-designated places in California